Bela Hodod (meaning "without borders"), an Arab live television talk show was from Cairo, which airs on Al Jazeera weekly. It is presented by Ahmed Mansour.  The program airs every Wednesday at 22:05 Mecca Time (19:05 UTC) and replays on the next day.

See also
 The Hidden is More Immense
 The Opposite Direction

Egyptian television talk shows

References